The Donaustadion is a multi-purpose stadium in Ulm, Germany. It is currently used mostly for football matches and is the home stadium of SSV Ulm 1846. The stadium is able to hold 19,500 people.

In 1999, a new stand was constructed, filling the last open gap of the former horseshoe shaped ground. This all-seated affair was the first non-smoking stand within a professional football ground in Germany.

References

Football venues in Germany
Athletics (track and field) venues in Germany
SSV Ulm 1846
Sports venues in Baden-Württemberg
Buildings and structures in Ulm
Sports venues completed in 1925
1925 establishments in Germany
UEFA Women's Championship final stadiums
Sport in Tübingen (region)